The CSX Bellwood Subdivision James River Bridge is a plate girder bridge that carries the Bellwood Subdivision over the James River in Richmond, Virginia.  The bridge was built by the Seaboard Air Line Railroad between 1897 and 1900.

The bridge begins just south of the Main Street Station and constitutes the middle part of the Triple Crossing, going under the Rivanna Subdivision and over the Richmond District (Norfolk Southern) prior to crossing the James River.

References

Railroad bridges in Virginia
Bridges over the James River (Virginia)
CSX Transportation bridges
Seaboard Air Line Railroad
Bridges in Richmond, Virginia
Plate girder bridges in the United States